Sinogastromyzon sichangensis is a species of ray-finned fish in the genus Sinogastromyzon. It is endemic to China and found in the upper Yangtze River system: Jinsha River and its tributaries Anning River and Qing River, in Hubei, Guizhou, Yunnan, and Sichuan provinces. It grows to  SL.

References

Sinogastromyzon
Freshwater fish of China
Endemic fauna of China
Fish described in 1944